The Allegheny Aqueduct was John A. Roebling's first wire cable suspension bridge.  It was built in 1844 near the later Fort Wayne Railroad Bridge as a replacement for a wooden covered bridge aqueduct over the Allegheny River in Pittsburgh, part of the Pennsylvania Canal.

References

External links 
 

Bridges in Pittsburgh
Navigable aqueducts in the United States
Pennsylvania Canal
Suspension bridges in Pennsylvania
Iron bridges in the United States
Transportation buildings and structures in Allegheny County, Pennsylvania